The German term Stammbuch may refer to:

a roll of arms, a book of coats of arms
an album amicorum, a book of friends' autographs

See also
 Stambach (disambiguation)
 Stammbach